The Ocean Resources Museum is a museum in Magong City, Penghu County, Taiwan.

History
The construction of the Gallery A of the museum was completed in 1994 and was opened in the same year. It was done by Jyun-han Design and Construction. The construction of the Gallery B of the museum was completed in March 1997 and was opened on 12 April 1997. It was done by Penghu Enterprise Limited Company.

Exhibitions

Gallery A
This gallery represents Penghu's marine ecology and resources with selected themes, such as the history of Penghu's marine culture, the evolution of marine lives, an introduction to Penghu's coral resources, the geology and topology of Penghu and the representation of Penghu's tidal flat. There are also a learning area and an auditorium room.

Gallery B
This gallery represents the development of local fisheries with several featured themes, including traditional fishing outfits, life in a fishing village, the development of fishing vessels, types of Penghu's fisheries, the distribution and harvest methods of the economic aquatic products in the waters around Penghu, and what it is like under the sea.

See also
 List of museums in Taiwan
 Maritime industries of Taiwan

References

1994 establishments in Taiwan
Museums established in 1994
History museums in Taiwan
Local museums in Taiwan
Maritime museums in Taiwan
Geology museums in Taiwan
Natural history museums in Taiwan
Food museums in Taiwan
Museums in Penghu County